Palatinate is the student newspaper of Durham University. One of Britain's oldest student publications, Palatinate is frequently ranked as one of the leading student outlets in the UK and Ireland, winning Best Publication in the Student Publication Association's 2018 and 2021 national awards. In the same year Palatinate was Highly Commended in the Best Publication category of the BBC Radio 4 Today Programme's Student Journalism Awards. Several of its editors have gone on to gain national recognition in journalism.

The name of the newspaper derives from the colour Palatinate, a shade of purple closely associated with the university and derived from County Durham's political history as a County Palatine. It published its first edition on 17 March 1948 and celebrated its 70th anniversary in 2018.

Palatinate is published on a fortnightly basis during term time, and its editors-in-chief are elected by the editorial board. The paper emphasises news and investigations about Durham University, and also includes sports, science, comment, satire, and a pull-out arts and lifestyle magazine, Indigo.

Durham Students’ Union previously paid for the publication of Palatinate, but the organisation now relies mostly on advertising and alumni donations to continue printing.

In April 2020, Palatinate launched a video side, Palatinate TV. Combined, over 150 student volunteers work for the newspaper and video outlet.

History 

The first issue of the student newspaper was published on 17 March 1948. Although the paper was initially designed to "bridge the gap" between the Newcastle and Durham divisions of the university poor sales in the Newcastle college led to the paper refocussing as a Durham-only publication after just three issues. Several of the Newcastle students involved in establishing Palatinate went on to set up their own paper for Newcastle students, King's Courier.

From 2001 until 2004, Palatinate was published in broadsheet format, before reverting to tabloid format.

In November 2008, Palatinate launched Indigo, an arts and features pull-out supplement, and celebrated its 700th edition.

In March 2013, a Science and Technology section was launched online and printed in the bumper 750th Celebratory Edition. In 2014, Palatinate launched a Profile section. Since December 2014, journalists from the newspaper have interviewed people such as Jess Phillips, Steph Houghton, David Blunkett, Edwina Currie, Moazzam Begg, Owen Jones, Esther Rantzen and Norman Baker.

In November 2015, issues began to be digitised on the Palatinate website. In 2017, the newspaper celebrated its 800th edition, with guest columns by former editors Sir Harold Evans, Hunter Davies and Jeremy Vine, along with an interview with George Alagiah. Palatinate celebrated its 70th anniversary in 2018.

In September 2020, citing the impact of COVID-19, Durham Students' Union cut its funding for Palatinate's print edition. Editors-in-Chief Imogen Usherwood and Tash Mosheim launched a fundraising appeal which provided the means to fund print for Michaelmas term in full and Epiphany in part. In November 2020, Palatinate's website was redesigned for the first time since its creation.

In March 2021, Palatinate announced the relaunch of PalatinateTV (or PalTV), which it described as "Durham's first student TV station". The trailer on YouTube featured former Palatinate Editor-in-Chief Jeremy Vine.

In May 2021, Palatinate was declared the best student publication in the UK at the Student Publication Association Awards. The paper also took home Best Reporter (Toby Donegan-Cross) and Best News Story, and was highly commended for the Billy Dowling-Reid Award for Outstanding Commitment (Imogen Usherwood and Tash Mosheim), Best Sports Coverage and Best Science Section. The paper had been nominated for 13 awards, including Best Website and Best Digital Media.

In November 2022, Palatinate's editorial board voted 97% in favour of becoming an independent newspaper, and leaving Durham Students Union.

Structure 
Palatinate is published by, but is editorially independent from, Durham Students’ Union. The newspaper has an editorial board of around 80 student volunteers, and its video side, Palatinate TV, has a separate team of a similar size. Students apply to volunteer for Palatinate, which does not charge membership fees. Both the newspaper and TV side train students for free in journalistic skills, including media law, video editing, camera operating, lighting and sound, and newspaper design software.

Many students every year leave Palatinate to work directly for media organisations or pursue postgraduate qualifications in journalism. There are two Editors-in-Chief of Palatinate, elected by the editorial board for two terms each, following a recommendation by a board of directors. All other roles in the newspaper and video side are appointed by the Editors-in-Chief after a competitive application process. The design of the newspaper has changed subtly over the years, including the introduction of a crest, and several redesigns of the arts and lifestyle magazine.

Awards 
 In 2021, Palatinate received national commendation in the Houses of Parliament for "providing a high standard of journalism and a pathway for a career in the media for students at Durham University."
 In 2021, Palatinate was named Best Student Publication of the Year at the Student Publication Awards. It was also highly commended for Best Coverage for its sport and science/technology sections.
 In 2021, PalTV was nominated for the Bright Network Impact on Campus Award.
Editor-in-Chief Toby Donegan-Cross won Best Reporter and Best News Story at the 2021 Student Publication Awards. Reporters Will Hutchings and Poppy-Lulu Roberts also received recognition.
 Editors-in-Chief Imogen Usherwood and Natasha Mosheim were highly commended for the Billy Dowling-Reid Award for Outstanding Commitment at the 2021 Student Publication Awards.
In 2018, Palatinate was named Best Student Publication of the Year at the Student Publication Awards. It also won the award for Best Reporter (Tania Chakraborti) and was highly commended for Best Reporter (Eugene Smith).
 Palatinate was highly commended in the Best Publication category of the BBC Radio 4 Today programme's Student Journalism Awards 2018.
In 2017, Palatinate won 'Best Publication (North)' at the 2017 Student Publication Association Regional Awards.
In 2001, Palatinate was named the NUS/The Independent Student Newspaper of the Year. In 2003, reporter Oliver Brown was runner-up for the Best Student Reporter category of the NUS National Student Media Awards.
 In 2008, content from Palatinate was showcased in the inaugural issue of FS magazine as an example of "the best of student journalism."
 In 1999, Palatinate was named runner-up in the Student Newspaper of the Year category of the Guardian Student Media Awards.
 In 2022, PalTV won Broadcaster of the Year at The National Student Television Association awards.

PalTV 
The first launch of Palatinate TV happened in 2009, when the Palatinate YouTube channel was first created. After a few dormant years, including another attempted reboot 2014, it was rebooted in 2021 as PalTV by Station Manager James Tillotson. It was used to host interviews with candidates for the upcoming Student Union elections. PalTV has since maintained content production throughout 2021, including interviews, "vox pop" interviews with students, and news coverage of local events.

PalTV runs a mentorship scheme for students looking to get involved in broadcast journalism.

In 2021, PalTV was nominated for the Bright Network Impact on Campus Award for "going above and beyond to support their members and the wider university to achieve success, in terms of careers and development of new skills and personal growth."

Notable editors-in-chief 

 Christopher Lamb, 2005 – Rome correspondent for The Tablet
Jonah Fisher, 1999 – climate correspondent for BBC News
Jane Marriot, 1997 – British High Commissioner to Kenya
Dan Rivers, 1994 – correspondent at ITV News
Cristina Nicolotti Squires, 1987 – Director of Content at Sky News
 Jeremy Vine, 1986 – BBC Radio 2 Host and journalist
George Alagiah, 1976 – newsreader and journalist 
Timothy Laurence, 1975 – Navy Admiral
 Piers Merchant, 1971 – British Conservative MP
Mark Featherstone-Witty, 1971 – co-founder of the Liverpool Institute of Performing Arts
Richard Ayre, 1969 – former Chief Executive at BBC News
 John Kay, 1963 – journalist for The Sun
John Exelby, 1962 – co-founder of BBC World Service
 William Quantrill, 1960 – former ambassador to Cameroon
 Hunter Davies, 1957 – biographer 
 D. A. Reeder, 1951 – British historian
 H. M. Evans, 1951 – editor for The Sunday Times
 Derek Harrison, 1950 – former superintendent at Durham Constabulary
 E. K. T. Coles, 1949 – specialist in adult literacy
 J. E. H. Spaul, 1948 – British ancient historian

References

External links 
 

Durham University
Student newspapers published in the United Kingdom
Publications established in 1948